= The Last Human Job =

2024 nonfiction book

The Last Human Job: The Work of Connecting in a Disconnected World is a 2024 nonfiction sociology book. It is written by American sociologist Allison J. Pugh and was published by Princeton University Press. A review published in the journal Social Forces (Oxford University Press) said the book has valuable insights for sociologists across multiple subfields. The book was awarded the Distinguished Scholarly Book Award by the American Sociological Association. Nature selected the book as one of their five best science picks.
